Parker Hall may refer to:

People
 Parker Hall (American football) (1916–2005)

Buildings
Parker Hall, Bates College, a dormitory hall named after Judge Thomas Parker
Parker Masonic Hall, Parker, SD, listed on the NRHP in South Dakota

Architectural disambiguation pages